Fabio Malberti (born 16 November 1976 in Desio) is a former Italian racing cyclist.

Major results

1997
 1st  Time trial, UCI Road World Under–23 Championships
 1st  Time trial, Mediterranean Games
 1st Overall Giro delle Regioni
1st Stage 1
 2nd  Time trial, European Under-23 Road Championships
 5th Overall GP Tell
1998
 3rd Overall Tour de Pologne
 6th Firenze–Pistoia
 9th Gran Premio Bruno Beghelli
1999
 1st Stage 8 Vuelta a Argentina
 2nd Giro del Medio Brenta
 4th Overall Volta a Portugal
 9th Overall Setmana Catalana de Ciclisme
2000
 3rd Overall Tour of Sweden
 7th Overall Tour de Luxembourg
 7th Overall Bayern Rundfahrt
2001
 4th Giro della Liguria
 6th Trofeo dell'Etna
 7th Overall Uniqa Classic

References

1976 births
Living people
Italian male cyclists
Mediterranean Games gold medalists for Italy
Mediterranean Games medalists in cycling
Competitors at the 1997 Mediterranean Games
People from Desio
Cyclists from the Province of Monza e Brianza